Brammeier is a surname. Notable people with the surname include:

Matt Brammeier (born 1985), Welsh cyclist and coach
Nikki Brammeier (born 1986), English cyclist